Robert Virves (born 8 July 2000) is an Estonian rally driver. He won the 2022 Junior World Rally Championship. Virves will compete in 2023 WRC-2 with Ford Fiesta Rally2.

Career

2022
At the Rally Estonia, Virves set a new record with most stage wins in the Junior WRC class in a single rally event. He won 17 stages, one more than Sébastien Ogier at the 2008 Jordan Rally. 

After winning the Acropolis Rally Greece, he become the 2022 FIA Junior WRC Champion.

Rally victories

JWRC victories

Results

WRC summary

WRC results 

* Season still in progress.

WRC-2

* Season still in progress

WRC-2 Challenger

* Season still in progress

ERC results

* Season still in progress

JWRC results

WRC-3 Junior

References

External links

ewrc-results profile
sport.postimees.ee
https://sport.err.ee/1608712312/robert-virves-tuli-kreekas-juunioride-maailmameistriks

2000 births
Living people
Estonian rally drivers
World Rally Championship drivers

European Rally Championship drivers